Hivehchi may refer to:
 Hivehchi-ye Bala
 Hivehchi-ye Markazi